Lineth Chepkurui (born 23 February 1988 in Bomet) is a Kenyan long distance runner.

At the 2008 World Cross Country Championships Chepkurui finished eleventh in the individual race, however this was not enough to be a part of the Kenyan team, who won silver medals in the team competition. She won her third consecutive Lilac Bloomsday Run in 2010, running a world's best time over 12 km with her course record run of 38:10.

Chepkurui is a two-time champion of the Bay to Breakers. In 2010, her time of 38:07 was a women's course record. She also set a course record at the Beach to Beacon 10K, knocking 26 seconds off the former record to win with a time of 31:00 minutes. She ran at the Falmouth Road Race two weeks later, but was beaten into second place by Wude Ayalew. She entered the Rock 'n' Roll Philadelphia Half Marathon in September and finished as runner-up with a personal best of 1:07:46, two seconds behind Meseret Defar.

Chepkurui trains with Kimbia Athletics and is coached by Dieter Hogen.

Achievements

Road running performances
2006 Philadelphia Half Marathon - 1st
Lilac Bloomsday Run - 1st (2008–2010)
2008 Cherry Blossom 10-Mile Run - 1st
2010 Philadelphia Half Marathon - 2nd

Personal bests
10 Kilometres  - 30:51 minutes
Half marathon - 1:07:46 hrs (2010)

Notes

References

External links

Kimbia Athletics



1988 births
Living people
People from Bomet County
Kenyan female long-distance runners
Kenyan female cross country runners